Audun Boysen (10 May 1929 – 2 March 2000) was a Norwegian middle distance runner. Born in Bjarkøy and raised in Rissa, he first represented Rissa IL and later IK Tjalve in Oslo.

Boysen was a prominent 800 metre runner in the 1950s, and he won a bronze medal at the 1956 Summer Olympics, a silver medal at the 1958 European Championships and another bronze at the 1954 European Championships. He set three world records over 1,000 metres, the last being 2:19.0 in 1955.

The same year he ran 800 metres in 1:45.9, setting a new Norwegian record. Incidentally, the man who beat him in that race, Belgian Roger Moens, ran a world record time, with Boysen also under the old world record. That Norwegian record stood for 37 years until 3 July 1992 when it was broken by Atle Douglas (1:45.15) and Vebjørn Rodal (1:45.33). Rodal became Olympic champion four years later.

References

Olympic athletes of Norway
1929 births
2000 deaths
Norwegian male middle-distance runners
Athletes (track and field) at the 1952 Summer Olympics
Athletes (track and field) at the 1956 Summer Olympics
Olympic bronze medalists for Norway
European Athletics Championships medalists
Medalists at the 1956 Summer Olympics
Olympic bronze medalists in athletics (track and field)